Halpahi (also Romanized as Halpah’ī, Halpehī, and Helpeh’ī; also known as Halpi, Helpeh, and Helpī) is a village in Zirrah Rural District, Sadabad District, Dashtestan County, Bushehr Province, Iran. At the 2006 census, its population was 1,455, in 329 families.

References 

Populated places in Dashtestan County